Saratovsky District is an administrative and municipal district (raion), one of the thirty-eight in Saratov Oblast, Russia. It is located in the center of the oblast. Its administrative center is the city of Saratov (which is not administratively a part of the district). Population: 48,105 (2010 Census);

Administrative and municipal status
Within the framework of administrative divisions, Saratovsky District is one of the thirty-eight in the oblast. The city of Saratov serves as its administrative center, despite being incorporated separately as a city under oblast jurisdiction—an administrative unit with the status equal to that of the districts.

As a municipal division, the district is incorporated as Saratovsky Municipal District. Saratov City Under Oblast Jurisdiction is incorporated separately from the district as Saratov Urban Okrug.

See also

References

Notes

Sources

Districts of Saratov Oblast

